Tina Iheagwam (born 3 April 1968) is a retired Nigerian athlete who competed in the 100 metres.

Achievements

1991 All-Africa Games - gold medal (200 m)
1989 African Championships - silver medal (100 m)
1987 Universiade - bronze medal (100 m)

External links

1968 births
Living people
Nigerian female sprinters
African Games gold medalists for Nigeria
African Games medalists in athletics (track and field)
Universiade medalists in athletics (track and field)
African Games bronze medalists for Nigeria
Athletes (track and field) at the 1987 All-Africa Games
Athletes (track and field) at the 1991 All-Africa Games
Universiade bronze medalists for Nigeria
Medalists at the 1987 Summer Universiade
World Athletics U20 Championships winners
20th-century Nigerian women